The 6th arrondissement of Paris (VIe arrondissement) is one of the 20 arrondissements of the capital city of France. In spoken French, it is referred to as le sixième.

The arrondissement, called Luxembourg in a reference to the seat of the Senate and its garden, is situated on the Rive Gauche of the River Seine. It includes educational institutions such as the École nationale supérieure des Beaux-Arts, the École des hautes études en sciences sociales and the Institut de France, as well as Parisian monuments such as the Odéon-Théâtre de l'Europe, the Pont des Arts, which links the 1st and 6th arrondissements over the Seine, Saint-Germain Abbey and Saint-Sulpice Church.

This central arrondissement, which includes the historic districts of Saint-Germain-des-Prés (surrounding the abbey founded in the 6th century) and Luxembourg (surrounding the Palace and its Gardens), has played a major role throughout Parisian history and is well known for its café culture and the revolutionary intellectualism (existentialism, authors such as Jean-Paul Sartre and Simone de Beauvoir) and literature (writers Paul Éluard, Boris Vian, Albert Camus and Françoise Sagan) it has hosted.

With its cityscape, intellectual tradition, history, architecture and central location, the arrondissement has long been home to French intelligentsia. It is a major locale for art galleries and fashion stores, as well as Paris's most expensive area. The arrondissement is one of France's richest districts in terms of average income; it is part of Paris Ouest alongside the 7th, 8th and 16th arrondissements, as well as the Neuilly-sur-Seine inner suburb. The 6th arrondissement is the smallest in Paris in terms of area covered.

History
The current 6th arrondissement, dominated by the Abbey of Saint-Germain-des-Prés—founded in the 6th century—was the heart of the Catholic Church's power in Paris for centuries, hosting many religious institutions.

In 1612, Queen Marie de Médicis bought an estate in the district and commissioned architect Salomon de Brosse to transform it into the outstanding Luxembourg Palace surrounded by extensive royal gardens. The new Luxembourg Palace turned the neighbourhood into a fashionable district for French nobility.

In the aftermath of the French Revolution, architect Jean-François-Thérèse Chalgrin was commissioned to redesign the Luxembourg Palace in 1800 to make it the seat of the newly-established Sénat conservateur. Nowadays, the grounds around the Luxembourg Palace, known as the Senate Garden (Jardin du Sénat), are open to the public; they have become a prised Parisian garden across from the 5th arrondissement's Panthéon.

Since the 1950s, the arrondissement, with its many higher education institutions, cafés (Café de Flore, Les Deux Magots, La Palette, Café Procope) and publishing houses (Gallimard, Julliard, Grasset) has been the home of much of the major post-war intellectual and literary movements and some of most influential in history such as surrealism, existentialism and modern feminism.

Geography

The land area of the arrondissement is 2.154 km2 (0.832 sq. mile, or 532 acres).

Cityscape

Places of interest
 Académie Française
 Café de Flore
 Café Procope
 Hôtel de Chimay
 Hôtel Lutetia
 Institut de France
 Jardin du Luxembourg
 Latin Quarter (partial)
 Les Deux Magots
 Medici Fountain
 Notre-Dame-des-Champs, Paris

 Odéon-Théâtre de l'Europe
 Polidor
 Pont des Arts
 Pont Neuf
 Pont Saint-Michel
 Saint-Denys-du-Saint-Sacrement (Neoclassical church) 
 Saint-Germain-des-Prés (church)
 Saint-Germain-des-Prés quarter 
 Saint-Sulpice church
 
 Senate (Luxembourg Palace)
 Théâtre du Vieux-Colombier

Museums
 Fondation Jean Dubuffet
 Maison d'Auguste Comte
 Monnaie de Paris
 Musée – Librairie du Compagnonnage
 Musée d'Anatomie Delmas-Orfila-Rouvière
 Musée de Minéralogie
 Musée Edouard Branly
 Musée Hébert
 Musée Zadkine

Colleges and universities
 Université Paris Cité (Saints-Pères campus)
Pantheon-Assas University (main campus)
Catholic University of Paris (main campus)
Lycée Stanislas
 École des hautes études en sciences sociales
 École nationale des ponts et chaussées
 École nationale supérieure des Beaux-Arts (PSL University)
 École nationale supérieure des mines de Paris (PSL University)
 Lycée Fénelon
 Lycée Montaigne
 Lycée Saint-Louis

Former places
 Arcade du Pont-Neuf
 Cherche-Midi prison
 Couvent des Cordeliers
 Comédie-Française
 Hôtel de Bourbon-Condé
 Hôtel de Condé

Main streets and squares

 Place du 18-Juin-1940
 Rue de l'Abbaye
 Rue de l'Ancienne Comédie
 Rue André-Mazet
 Rue d'Assas
 Rue Auguste Comte
 Rue de Beaux Arts
 Rue Bonaparte
 named after Napoleon
 Rue Bréa
 named after General Jean Baptiste Fidèle Bréa (1790–1848)
 Rue de Buci
 named after Simon de Buci, President of the Parlement of Paris, who had purchased the Gate Saint-Germain (now demolished) in 1350
 Rue des Canettes
 Rue Cassette
 Rue du Cherche-Midi
 Rue Christine
 named after Christine of France, Duchess of Savoy (1606–1663)
 Rue de Condé
 named after the former Hôtel de Condé, of which forecourt faced the street
 Quai de Conti
 Rue Danton
 Passage Dauphine
 Rue Dauphine
 named after King Louis XIII (1601-1643), Dauphin of France from 1601 to 1610
 Rue du Dragon
 Rue Duguay-Trouin
 Rue Dupin
 Rue de l'École de Médecine
 Rue de Fleurus
 Rue du Four
 Place de Furstemberg
 Rue de Furstemberg
 Rue Garancière
 Quai des Grands-Augustins
 Rue des Grands Augustins
 Rue Grégoire de Tours
 named after Saint Gregory of Tours, Bishop of Tours (538–594)
 Rue Guisarde
 Rue Guynemer
 Rue Hautefeuille
 Place Henri Mondor
 Rue Jacques Callot
 named after Jacques Callot (1592–1635), engraver
 Rue du Jardinet
 Rue Jacob
 Rue Lobineau
 Rue Mabillon
 Rue Madame
 named after Marie Joséphine of Savoy (1753–1810), styled Madame
 Quai Malaquais
 Rue Mayet
 Rue Mazarine
 Rue de Médicis
 Rue de Mézières
 Rue Mignon
 Rue Monsieur-le-Prince
 Boulevard du Montparnasse
 Rue de Nesle
 Rue de Nevers
 Rue Notre-Dame des Champs
 Carrefour de l'Odéon
 Rue de l'Odéon
 Rue Palatine
 named after Anne Henriette of Bavaria, Princess Palatine (1648–1723)
 Rue Pierre Sarrazin
 Rue des Poitevins
 Rue du Pont de Lodi
 named after Bonaparte's victory on May 10, 1796, at the Battle of Lodi
 Rue Princesse
 named after Catherine de Lorraine, Princess de Dombes (1552–1596)
 Rue des Quatre Vents
 Place du Québec
 Boulevard Raspail
 named after François Vincent Raspail (1794–1878) French chemist and politician
 Rue de Rennes
 Rue Saint-André-des-Arts
 Rue Saint-Benoît
 Boulevard Saint-Germain (partial)
 Rue Saint-Jean-Baptiste de la Salle
 Boulevard Saint-Michel (partial)
 Place Saint-Michel (partial)
 Place Saint-Sulpice
 Rue Saint-Sulpice
 Rue des Saints Pères
 Rue de Savoie
 Rue de Seine
 Rue de Sèvres
 Rue Stanislas
 named after the nearby collège Stanislas, founded under Louis XVIII of France, and named after one of his first names
 Rue de Tournon
 named after Cardinal François de Tournon (1489–1562)
 Rue de Vaugirard (partial)
 Rue Vavin
 named after the 19th-century politician Alexis Vavin
 Rue Visconti
 named after Louis Visconti (1791–1853), designer of Napoleon's tomb

Demography
The arrondissement attained its peak population in 1911 when the population density reached nearly 50,000 inhabitants per km2. In 2009, the population was 43,143 inhabitants while the arrondissement provided 43,691 jobs.

Economy
Toei Animation Europe has its head office in the arrondissement. The company, which opened in 2004, serves France, Germany, Italy, Spain, and the United Kingdom.

Real estate
The 6th and 7th arrondissements are the most expensive districts of Paris, the most expensive parts of the 6th arrondissement being Saint-Germain-des-Prés quarter, the riverside districts and the areas nearby the Luxembourg Garden.

Historical population

Immigration

Notable people
 

Raymond Aron (1905–1983), historian and philosopher
Maurice Françon (1913–1996), engineer and physicist

References

External links